The sport of football in the country of the Federated States of Micronesia is run by the Federated States of Micronesia Football Association. The association administers the national football team, as well as the Pohnpei Premier League.

Football stadiums in Micronesia

References